Al-Ajayrat is a sub-district located in As Sawd District, 'Amran Governorate, Yemen.Al-Ajayrat had a population of 1235 according to the 2004 census.

References 

Sub-districts in As Sawd District